Pseudodontodynerus is a genus of potter wasps distributed throughout the Palearctic, Indomalayan and Afrotropical regions.

Species
The following species are classified as members of Pseudodontodynerus:

Pseudodontodynerus brittoni Giordani Soika, 1957
Pseudodontodynerus dunbrodyensis (Cameron, 1905)
Pseudodontodynerus gambiensis (Meade-Waldo, 1915)
Pseudodontodynerus karaikkalensis (Giordani Soika, 1981)
Pseudodontodynerus novissimus Giordani Soika, 1982
Pseudodontodynerus peculiariventris Giordani Soika, 1952
Pseudodontodynerus pretiosus (Dusmet, 1928)
Pseudodontodynerus schwarzi Gusenleitner, 2009

References

Biological pest control wasps
Potter wasps